The 2023 TPG Tour is the 17th season of the TPG Tour, the main professional golf tour in Argentina since it was established in 2007.

Schedule
The following table lists official events during the 2023 season.

Notes

References

TPG Tour
TPG Tour
TPG Tour